This is a list of newspapers in Arizona.

Daily newspapers (currently published)This is a list of daily newspapers currently published in Arizona. For weekly newspapers, see List of newspapers in Arizona.
 The Scottsdale Herald – online
 Arizona Gazette – online
 Arizona Business Daily – online
 Arizona Daily Independent – Tucson
 Arizona Daily Star – Tucson
 Arizona Daily Sun – Flagstaff
 The Arizona Republic – Phoenix
 Casa Grande Dispatch – Casa Grande
 The Daily Courier – Prescott
 Daily Independent-Independent Newsmedia – Sun City
 The Daily Territorial – Tucson
 The Kingman Daily Miner – Kingman
 Mohave Valley Daily News – Bullhead City
 Sierra Vista Herald – Sierra Vista
 Today's News-Herald – Lake Havasu City
 Yuma Sun – Yuma

Weekly newspapers (currently published)
 Ahwatukee Foothills News – Ahwatukee
 Ajo Copper News – Ajo
 Al-Mashreg – Phoenix
 Arizona Business Gazette – Phoenix
 Arizona Capitol Times – Phoenix
 Arizona Chinese News – Phoenix
 Arizona City Independent – Arizona City
 Arizona Range News – Willcox
 Arizona Silver Belt – Globe
 Asian American Times – Mesa
 Bisbee Observer – Bisbee
 The Buckeye Star – Buckeye
 Camp Verde Bugle – Camp Verde 
 The Camp Verde Journal – Camp Verde
 Chino Valley Review – Chino Valley
 Coolidge Examiner – Coolidge
 Copper Basin News – Kearny
 The Copper Era – Safford
 Cottonwood Journal Extra – Phoenix
 Douglas Dispatch – Douglas
 East Valley Tribune – Mesa
 Eastern Arizona Courier – Safford
 Eloy Enterprise – Eloy
 Florence Reminder & Blade-Tribune – Florence
 The Foothills Focus – New River
 Fountain Hills Times – Fountain Hills
 Gila Bend Sun – Gila Bend
 Glendale Star – Glendale
 Grand Canyon News – Grand Canyon
 Green Valley News & Sun – Green Valley
 The Independent Newspapers – Apache Junction/Gold Canyon, Queen Creek San Tan Valley, East Mesa, Scottsdale, Town of Paradise Valley, Peoria, Sun City/Youngtown, Sun City West, and Surprise, Arizona
 InMaricopa – Maricopa
 Inside Tucson Business – Tucson
 Jewish News of Greater Phoenix – Phoenix 
 Kingman Standard – Kingman
 Lake Powell Chronicle – Page
 Maricopa Monitor – Maricopa, Arizona
 Mountain View News – Sierra Vista
 Navajo-Hopi Observer – Flagstaff
 Navajo Times – Window Rock
 Nogales International – Nogales
 The Northwest Explorer – Tucson
 Parker Pioneer – Parker
 Payson Roundup – Payson
 Peoria Times – Peoria
 Phoenix Business Journal – Phoenix
 Phoenix New Times – Phoenix
 Prescott Valley Tribune – Prescott Valley
 The Record Reporter – Phoenix
 Rim Country Gazette – Payson
 San Carlos Apache Moccasin – Globe
 San Manuel Miner – San Manuel
 San Pedro Valley News-Sun – Benson
 Scottsdale Independent – Scottsdale
 Sedona Red Rock News – Sedona
 Sonoran News – Cave Creek
 Superior Sun – Superior
 The Tombstone News – Tombstone
 The Tribune-News – Holbrook
 Tucson Weekly – Tucson
 Verde Independent – Cottonwood
 La Voz – Phoenix and Tucson
 The Weekly Bulletin – Sonoita
 West Valley View – Avondale
 White Mountain Independent – Show Low
 The Wickenburg Sun – Wickenburg
 Williams-Grand Canyon News – Williams

Biweekly newspapers (currently published)
 Arizona Jewish Post – Tucson, Arizona

Monthly newspapers (currently published)
 Arcadia News – Phoenix
 The Catholic Sun – Phoenix
 Gilbert Independent – Apache Junction
 Catholic Outlook – Tucson
 Economic Development Journal of Mohave County – Bullhead City, Arizona
 The Noise – Flagstaff and Prescott
 The Tanque Verde Voice – Tanque Verde Valley area, Tucson, Arizona
 The Tombstone Epitaph – Tombstone
 The Vail Voice – Vail, Arizona
 Valley India Times – (Indo-American Newspaper)
 The Valley Times – Scottsdale
 The Write Up Newspaper – (African-American urban newspaper)

Quarterly newspapers (currently published)
 The Beehive newspaper – Mesa, Arizona

University newspapers
 Arizona Daily Wildcat – University of Arizona
 Pima Post – Pima Community College
 The Lumberjack – Northern Arizona University
 State Press – Arizona State University
 Mesa Legend – Mesa Community College
 Downtown Devil – ASU Downtown

Defunct
 The Buffalo – Fort Huachuca in the 1940s

 93d Blue Helmet – Fort Huachuca in the 1940s
 Ádahooníłígíí – Navajo Nation in the 1940s and 1950s
 Apache Drum Beat – San Carlos Apache Indian Reservation in the 1960s
 Apache Junction News – Apache Junction
 Apache Sentinel – Fort Huachuca in the 1940sSee also: Post Script of the Apache Sentinel,Post Script
 The Argus – Holbrook 1890s – 1900s
 Arizona Black Dispatch – Phoenix in the 1970s
 The Arizona Champion – Peach Springs and Flagstaff 1880s – 1890s
 Arizona Citizen – Tucson 1870s – 1880s  See also: Arizona Weekly Citizen, Tucson Citizen, Arizona Daily Citizen.
 Arizona Copper Camp – Ray in the 1910s and 1920s
 Arizona Daily Citizen – Tucson 1880s – 1900s See also: Arizona Citizen, Tucson Citizen, Arizona Weekly Citizen.
 The Arizona Daily Orb – Bisbee 1890s – 1900s 
 The Arizona Gleam – Phoenix in the 1920s and 1930s
 The Arizona Journal
 The Arizona Kicker – Tombstone
 Arizona Miner – Prescott See also Arizona Weekly Journal-Miner, Arizona Weekly Miner.
 Arizona Sentinel – Yuma 1910s  See also:The Arizona Sentinel,Yuma Sun, Arizona Sentinel and Weekly Yuma Examiner, Arizona Sentinel Yuma Southwest.
 The Arizona Sentinel – Yuma 1870s – 1910s See also:Arizona Sentinel,Yuma Sun, Arizona Sentinel and Weekly Yuma Examiner, Arizona Sentinel Yuma Southwest.
 Arizona Sentinel and Weekly Yuma Examiner – Yuma 1910s See also:Yuma Sun, Arizona Sentinel, (The Arizona Sentinel, Arizona Sentinel Yuma Southwest.
 Arizona Sentinel Yuma Southwest – Yuma 1910s See also:Yuma Sun, Arizona Sentinel, The Arizona Sentinel, Arizona Sentinel and Weekly Yuma Examiner.
 Arizona State Miner – Randsburg, California and Wickenburg 1890s – 1920s
 Arizona Sun – Phoenix 1940s – 1960s
 The Arizona Times – Tucson in the 1920s and 1930s
 Arizona Tribune – Phoenix 1950s – 1970s
 Arizona Weekly Citizen – Tucson 1880s – 1890s See also: Arizona Citizen, Tucson Citizen, Arizona Daily Citizen.
 Arizona Weekly Enterprise – Florence 1880s – 1890s
 Arizona Weekly Journal-Miner – Prescott See also: Arizona Miner, Arizona Weekly Miner.
 Arizona Weekly Miner – Prescott See also: Arizona Miner, Arizona Weekly Journal-Miner.
 Arizona Weekly Republican – Phoenix in the 1890sList of newspapers in Arizona
 Arizona's Negro Journal – Tucson in the 1940s
 The Arizonian (newspaper) – Scottsdale in the 1950s and 1960s
 The Bachelor's Beat
 Buckeye Valley News – Buckeye
 Bullhead City Bee – Bullhead City
 The Copper Era and Morenci Leader – Clifton, Arizona
 The Latter-Day Sentinel
 Phoenix Gazette
 Post Script – Fort Huachuca in the 1940s See also: Post Script of the Apache Sentinel, Apache Sentinel
 Post Script of the Apache Sentinel – Fort Huachuca in the 1940s See also: Post Script, Apache Sentinel
 La Prensa Hispana
 Prensa Mexicana – Tucson, Arizona in the 1950s
 The Rep
 Salt River Herald - Phoenix, Arizona 1878-1879 https://chroniclingamerica.loc.gov/lccn/sn87062081/
 Swansea Times – Swansea
 Tombstone Citizen – Tombstone, Arizona
 Tombstone Epitaph (Daily) – Tombstone, Arizona in the 1880s  See also: Tombstone Epitaph (Weekly)
 Tombstone Epitaph (Weekly) – Tombstone, Arizona in the 1880s See also: Tombstone Epitaph (Daily)
 The Tucson Citizen – Tucson in the 1900s
 Weekly Arizonian
 The Winslow Mail – Winslow
 Weekly Nugget  – Tombstone in the 1880s
 Winslow Daily Mail see:The Winslow Mail – Winslow

See also

References

External links
 . (Survey of local news existence and ownership in 21st century)

</noinclude>